Shots in Threequarter Time is a 1965 crime film directed by Alfred Weidenmann.

Plot
The film begins in Paris. A man, called Bérard, flees from his pursuers with a metal suitcase. He follows the instructions on a walkie-talkie and sits down in a chair. At a certain point he throws the suitcase into the depths. Then he is shot by an undetected sniper. Thus begins the story to a strictly guarded NATO controller for missiles - the so-called B 501 - which was stolen and device in this way in enemy hands. There is just this one model, and in the Paris command post of NATO prevails frenzy. The commanding officer, Colonel, gets eight days in which to recover the device. Hence he places his best man, secret agent Philippe Tissot, in this case on. Tissot is to remain undetected necessarily in this secret mission and therefore operated under the code name "Caesar". He quickly takes to track down the missing device.

This trail leads to Vienna. Tissot takes the night train and met there already some obscure figures who behave suspiciously abundant and strange. In the Austrian capital arrived, Tissot moves into the "Palladium", a variety theatre with a very dubious reputation. This establishment is considered as a transit point for stolen goods and secret as not dangerous playground for enemy agents and assassins. Behind the scenes of this only seemingly harmless amusement facility eventually all the threads together, murders are prepared and exchanged information. Soon Tissot gets into great danger, and there are the first bodies. Another trail leads him to a waxworks. In an exciting chase through Vienna Tissot can finally bring the control unit back in.

Cast
Pierre Brice as Philippe Tissot
Heinz Drache	 as Pierre Gilbert
Daliah Lavi	 as Irina Badoni
Jana Brejchová	 as Violetta
Charles Régnier	 as Henry
Walter Giller	 as Renato Balli
Terence Hill	 as Enrico (credited as Mario Girotti)
Gustav Knuth	 as Igor
Anton Diffring	 as Burger
Senta Berger	 as Captain Jenny
Paola Pitagora as Claudette
Daniël Sola	 as Joscha
Walter Regelsberger	 as Gorba
Hans Unterkircher	 as Bernard
Karl Zarda	 as Ledin
Erica Vaal	 as Jeanette

External links
 

1965 films
1960s crime thriller films
1960s spy thriller films
Austrian crime thriller films
German crime thriller films
German spy thriller films
West German films
Italian thriller films
1960s German-language films
Films directed by Alfred Weidenmann
Films set in Vienna
1960s Italian films
1960s German films